Walter Baureis (22 April 1930 – 22 May 2014) was a German football defender for Karlsruher SC (winning the DFB Pokal in 1955 and 1956), and later a manager.

References

1930 births
2014 deaths
German footballers
Karlsruher SC players
Association football defenders
German football managers
1. FC Pforzheim managers
Karlsruher SC managers
West German footballers
People from Bergstraße (district)
Sportspeople from Darmstadt (region)
Footballers from Hesse
West German football managers
Germany B international footballers